Michael Alan Devecka (born November 13, 1947, in Portland, Oregon) is an American former Nordic combined skier who competed in the 1972 Winter Olympics, 1976 Winter Olympics, and in the 1980 Winter Olympics. His daughter from his relationship with Dianne Holum is Kirstin, a Catholic sister based in Leeds, England, where she has served as Sister Catherine, and a former speed skater.

References

1947 births
Living people
American male Nordic combined skiers
Olympic Nordic combined skiers of the United States
Nordic combined skiers at the 1972 Winter Olympics
Nordic combined skiers at the 1976 Winter Olympics
Nordic combined skiers at the 1980 Winter Olympics